The 111th Pennsylvania House of Representatives District  is located in Susquehanna County and Wayne County and includes the following areas:

 All of Susquehanna County
 Wayne County
 Berlin Township
 Bethany
 Buckingham Township
 Canaan Township
 Clinton Township
 Damascus Township
 Dyberry Township
 Honesdale
 Lebanon Township 
 Manchester Township
 Mount Pleasant Township
 Oregon Township
 Preston Township
 Prompton
 Scott Township
 Starrucca
 Texas Township
 Waymart

Representatives

References

Government of Susquehanna County, Pennsylvania
Government of Wayne County, Pennsylvania

111